Triphenylphosphine selenide is an organophosphorus compound with the formula (C6H5)3PSe. It is a white solid which is soluble in most organic solvents. The compound is used in the preparation of other selenium compounds and is itself prepared by the reaction of triphenylphosphine with potassium selenocyanate. Single crystals have been isolated with both monoclinic and triclinic structures (space groups: P21/c and P respectively); in both cases the geometry at phosphorus is tetrahedral.

See also
 Triphenylphosphine oxide
 Triphenylphosphine sulfide
 Trioctylphosphine selenide

References

Organophosphanes
Selenides
Phenyl compounds